Lockheed (originally spelled Loughead) may refer to:

Brands and enterprises
 Lockheed Corporation, a former American aircraft manufacturer 
 Lockheed Martin, formed in 1995 by the merger of Lockheed Corporation and Martin Marietta
 Lockheed Martin Aeronautics
 Lockheed Martin Space Systems
 Lockheed Shipbuilding and Construction Company

People
 Flora Haines Loughead (1855-1943), American writer, farmer, miner
  The brothers who founded the original Lockheed Corporation:
 Allan Loughead (1889–1969), American aviation pioneer
 Malcolm Loughead, American aviation pioneer

Other uses
 Lockheed (comics), a Marvel Comics character
 Lockheed Martin Transit Center, in Sunnyvale, California